Kariz Sukhteh-ye Dowlatabad (also Romanized as Kārīz Sūkhteh-ye Dowlatābād; also known as Kārīz Sūkhteh, Dowlatābād, and Kārīz Sūkhtah) is a village in Qalandarabad Rural District, Qalandarabad District, Fariman County, Razavi Khorasan Province, Iran. At the 2006 census, its population was 183, in 45 families.

References 

Populated places in Fariman County